In mathematics, the K transform (also called the Kemp-Macdonald Transform or Single-Pixel X-ray Transform) is an integral transform introduced by R. Scott Kemp and Ruaridh Macdonald in 2016. The transform allows a 3-dimensional inhomogeneous object to be reconstructed from scalar point measurements taken in the volume external to the object.

This uniqueness arises by the use of a monotonic, nonlinear transform of the X-ray transform. By selecting the exponential function for the transform function, which coincides with attenuation of particles in matter in accordance with the Beer–Lambert law, the K transform can be used to perform tomography of 3-dimensional objects using a low-resolution single-pixel detector. A numerical inversion using the BFGS optimization algorithm was explored by Fichtlscherer.

Definition
Let an object  be a function of compact support that maps into the positive real numbers

The K-transform of the object  is defined as

Applications 
The K transform has been proposed as a means of performing a physical one-time pad encryption of a physical object.

References 

Integral transforms